Luis Miller Dunckel (February 11, 1899March 28, 1975) was a Michigan politician.

Early life
Dunckel was born on February 11, 1899, in Springfield, Missouri. He served in the United States Army in World War I.

Professional career
In 1932, Dunckel was defeated in the Republican primary for the Michigan Senate seat representing the 6th district. On November 6, 1934, Dunckel was elected to the Michigan Senate where he represented the 6th district from January 2, 1935, to December 31, 1938. Dunckel served as Michigan State Treasurer from 1939 to 1940. Dunckel was defeated in the 1940 Republican primary for the office of Governor of Michigan.

Personal life
Miller Dunckel was married to Elizabeth T. Dunckel. Dunckel was a part of various groups, such as the Elks, the Freemasons, the American Legion, the Fraternal Order of Eagles, the Loyal Order of Moose, and the Veterans of Foreign Wars.

Dunckel died on March 28, 1975, in San Diego County, California, of pneumonia. Dunckel was interred at Eternal Hills Memorial Park in Oceanside, California.

References

1899 births
1975 deaths
American Freemasons
Burials in California
Republican Party Michigan state senators
United States Army personnel of World War I
Politicians from Springfield, Missouri
State treasurers of Michigan
20th-century American politicians